Nivesht (also Romanized as Nīvesht and Nīvasht; also known as Nīāz) is a village in Shahsavan Kandi Rural District, in the Central District of Saveh County, Markazi Province, Iran. At the 2006 census, its population was 201, in 81 families.

References 

Populated places in Saveh County